Jeremy Tyler Harris II (born September 10, 1996) is an American professional basketball player for Borås Basket of the Swedish Basketball League. He played college basketball Buffalo Bulls of the Mid-American Conference (MAC).

High school career
As a senior at Page High School, Harris led the team to the 2014 NCHSAA 4-A state tournament. Harris was the No. 8-rated prep player in North Carolina coming out of high school.

College career
He competed for two seasons at Gulf Coast State College. In his freshman season at Gulf Coast, he averaged 13.7 points and 6.3 rebounds per game. As a sophomore, Harris posted 18.7 points and 5.2 rebounds per game.

After his sophomore season, Harris committed to play for Buffalo over Texas Tech because he liked the coaching style. Harris had 22 points and a career-high 14 rebounds in an 83–69 victory over Eastern Michigan Eagles men's basketball on January 23, 2018. He scored a career-high 27 points, pulled down 10 rebounds and dished out three assists in a March 8 win over Central Michigan. As a junior, Harris averaged 15.4 points, 5.8 rebounds. 2.3 assists and 1.0 steals per game, shooting 42 percent behind the arc. He was named to the Second-team All-Mid-American Conference at the conclusion of his junior season. Harris led the Bulls to an 89–68 upset over the fourth-seeded Arizona in the NCAA Tournament, contributing 23 points and seven rebounds. As a senior, Harris averaged 14 points and 6.2 rebounds per game, helping the Bulls to their second straight NCAA Tournament appearance. He was named the Mid-American Conference tournament Most Valuable Player.

Professional career
After going undrafted in the 2019 NBA draft, Harris signed with Atomerőmű SE of the NB I/A. He averaged 6.8 points per game in his rookie season. On August 2, 2020, Harris signed with Borås Basket in Sweden.

Career statistics

College

|-
| style="text-align:left;"| 2017–18
| style="text-align:left;"| Buffalo
| 36 || 36 || 33.3 || .471 || .418 || .787 || 5.9 || 2.1 || 1.0 || .7 || 15.5
|-
| style="text-align:left;"| 2018–19
| style="text-align:left;"| Buffalo
| 36 || 36 || 31.2 || .418 || .270 || .724 || 6.2 || 3.0 || 1.1 || .7 || 14.0
|- class="sortbottom"
| style="text-align:center;" colspan="2"| Career
| 72 || 72 || 32.2 || .444 || .342 || .755 || 6.0 || 2.6 || 1.1 || .7 || 14.8

References

External links
Buffalo Bulls bio
ESPN profile

1996 births
Living people
African-American basketball players
American expatriate basketball people in Hungary
American expatriate basketball people in Sweden
American men's basketball players
Atomerőmű SE players
Basketball players from Greensboro, North Carolina
Buffalo Bulls men's basketball players
Gulf Coast State College alumni
Junior college men's basketball players in the United States
Place of birth missing (living people)
Shooting guards
Small forwards
21st-century African-American sportspeople